Peter Gabriel (born 1950) is an English progressive rock musician, formerly of Genesis. It is also the name of four eponymous albums:

Peter Gabriel (1977 album), his first album, nicknamed Car
Peter Gabriel (1978 album), his second album, nicknamed Scratch
Peter Gabriel (1980 album), his third album, nicknamed Melt and Intruder
Peter Gabriel (1982 album), his fourth album, titled Security in the United States

See also
Pierre Gabriel, French mathematician
Petr Gabriel, Czech footballer